The 2010 Crocodile Trophy was the 16th edition of the Crocodile trophy Mountain Bike stage race. The race was held from 19 October to 28 October. The race covered  divided over 10 stages.

The favourites for the overall victory all finished on the podium in the 2009 edition: Urs Huber, Bart Brentjens and Mike Mulkens. The three cyclist would finish in the same order on the podium of the 2010 edition. Among the competitors was also Jaan Kirsipuu, a former Tour de France yellow jersey wearer and multiple stage winner. Kirispuu would eventually win the general classification in the M2 class.

Race overview
Stage 6 was neutralized due to the death of Dutch cyclist Weit Heuker. The 59-year-old died during the night of October 23–24. Out of respect the stage was neutralized and no changes were made in the general classification.

Stages

References

Mountain biking events in Australia
2010 in mountain biking
2010 in Australian sport
Cycle racing in Australia